Marko Pyykönen (born 30 September 1989) is a Finnish badminton player.

Achievements

BWF International Challenge/Series 
Men's doubles

Mixed doubles

  BWF International Challenge tournament
  BWF International Series tournament
  BWF Future Series tournament

References

External links 
 

1989 births
Living people
Finnish male badminton players
20th-century Finnish people
21st-century Finnish people